The Tarot de Besançon, also called the Besançon Tarot or Swiss Tarot, describes a type of Tarot pack for card games that was derived from the older forms of the Marseille type, but which portrays characteristic differences.

Cards of this type were manufactured predominantly in Switzerland in the middle of the 18th century. The packs take their name from the eastern French town of Besançon, to which the cardmakers moved their production in the early 19th century. The cards were not just made in Switzerland or Besançon, but from about 1750 across a wide area including southern France, Switzerland and even south Germany.

Typical of card packs of the Besançon type is that the cards traditionally depicting the Papess and the Pope were redesigned to portray the Roman gods, Juno and Jupiter. It is assumed that this renaming took place in order to avoid upsetting religious sensitivities in an area of distribution marked by confessional contrasts.

Other features of the Besançon type compared with the Marseille Tarot are:
 Cupid is aiming at the eyes of the lovers.
 The face of the Moon appears head on and not in profile.
 The world is not depicted dancing, but standing in contrapost.

Known manufacturers of card packs of this type are:
 Jean-Baptiste Benois
 Suzanne Bernardin
 J. Blanche, Besançon
 J. H. Blanck et Tschann
 Louis Carey, Strasbourg
 Andreas Benedict Göbl
 Arnoult Grimaud
 François Héri
 Jean Jerger, Besançon
 A. Kirchner, Besançon
 Joseph Krebs, Freiburg
 L. de Laboisse, Strasbourg
 Pierre Lachapele
 Nicolas François Laudier, Strasbourg
 Jean Pierre Laurent
 Arnoult Lequart
 Guillaume Mann, Colmar
 Johann Pelagius Mayer, Constance
 Renault, Besançon
 Bernhard Schaer, Mumlisweil
 Jean Tissot
 Wolfgang Weber
 Johannes Muller, Schaffhousen
 Josef Rauch Miller, Salzburg 

The Besançon Tarot includes the Tarot 1JJ, which forms its own sub-type (see details at that article), and the Tarot d’Épinal, which also has specific variations in design. It was manufactured around 1830 or 1850 by the cardmaker, Pellerin, in Épinal, the wood engraving comes from François Georgin (1801–1863). Among the features are an additional card with the title, Consultant, which was clearly used as a Significator, which is why it may be assumed that the cards were also used for divinatory purposes and not, like other packs of this type at that time, used exclusively for playing cards.

The pictures below, showing the 22 trump cards, come from a pack with coloured wood carvings produced by Renault from Besançon around 1820–1830. The pack is based on a c. 1800 design by Jean Jerger, also from Besançon.

References

Literature 

 Eckhard Graf: Lexikon des Tarot sowie der Orakel- und Selbsterfahrungsspiele. Nagelschmid, Stuttgart 1991, .
 Belinda Rodik: Tarot-Lexikon. Grundbegriffe und Schlüsselworte zu Symbolik und Deutung. Schirmer, Darmstadt 2008, pp 323–346.

Tarot playing card decks